Eyre Hutson may  refer to:
Eyre Hutson (priest), Archdeacon of the Virgin Islands from 1885 to 1921
Sir Eyre Hutson (colonial administrator), Governor of British Honduras 1918 to 1925, son of the above